Pheosia is a genus of moths of the family Notodontidae.

Species
Pheosia albivertex (Hampson, [1893])
Pheosia buddhista (Püngeler, 1899)
Pheosia fusiformis (Matsumura)
Pheosia gnoma (Fabricius, 1777)
Pheosia rimosa Packard, 1864 (syn: Pheosia portlandia H. Edwards, 1886)
Pheosia tremula (Clerck, 1759)
?Pheosia dimidiata Herrich-Schäffer, 1856

External links

Notodontidae